Alexander Vasilyevich Bortnikov (born 15 November 1951) is a Russian intelligence officer who has served as the director of the Russian Federal Security Service (FSB) since 2008. He is one of the most powerful members of the silovik faction of president Vladimir Putin's inner circle. A Hero of the Russian Federation since 2019, he also holds the rank of General of the Army, the highest grade in use in the Russian military.

Early life and career
Bortnikov was born in Molotov, Russian SFSR, Soviet Union (now Perm, Russia) in 1951. In 1966 he joined Komsomol, the Communist Party's youth wing. He graduated from the Leningrad Institute of Railway Engineers in 1973, joining the Communist Party nearly immediately upon graduation. He then worked as a railway engineer in Gatchina for two years before joining the Committee for State Security (KGB) in 1975. He spent the next 28 years working for the KGB, its interim successor the Federal Counterintelligence Service (FSK), and ultimately the FSB, based in Saint Petersburg/ Leningrad for the entire period. According to The Times of London, Bortnikov and Vladimir Putin first met while both stationed in Leningrad in the 1970s, however Bortnikov has never elaborated on rumors about their first meeting.

Bortnikov's break came in June 2003, when Sergey Smirnov, chief of the Saint Petersburg and Leningrad Oblast FSB, was sent to Moscow to become the principal deputy to the director of the agency amid the Three Whales Corruption Scandal. Bortnikov was promoted to fill the vacancy. On 24 February 2004 he was moved to Moscow and made chief of the Economic Security Service of the FSB, a deputy director of the agency. Sergey Naryshkin, the current head of the SVR, was transferred from St. Petersburg to Moscow at the same time.

In February 2007, Russian magazine The New Times wrote about the plan to murder defected FSB officer Alexander Litvinenko with reference to a source in the FSB, alleging "head of the FSB Economic Security Department general-lieutenant Alexander Bortnikov had allegedly been appointed overseer of the operation."

In May 2007, he was reported to have been implicated in a money laundering case investigated by the Russian Interior Ministry in connection with the murder of the Central Bank Deputy Head Andrey Kozlov.

Director of the FSB
On 12 May 2008, Bortnikov was appointed Director of the FSB by president Dmitry Medvedev. His tenure as FSB director has seen the agency return to the "punishing sword" once ascribed to the Cheka.

Bortnikov is widely seen as a hawk and a willing participant in the Russian government's political repression at home and subversion abroad, however, compared to his peers, Bortnikov has a reputation as one of the more individually honest figures. One former FSB officer claimed Bornikov is "uncomfortable with the condition of the agency, the blatant corruption, the indiscipline, the mercenaryism. But he doesn’t know what to do about it, and thinks it’s not as important as doing the [political] job'."

In a December 2017 open letter published by Kommersant, more than 30 Russian academics criticized Bortnikov for attempting to legitimize the Stalinist Great Purge in an interview he gave to Rossiiskaya Gazeta on the hundredth anniversary of the establishment of the Cheka, in which Bortnikov said the archives showed "a significant part" of the criminal cases of that period "had an objective side to them." Nikita Petrov, a historian who studies the Soviet security services for  Memorial, condemned Bortnikov's claims as legal nihilism in an interview with Novaya Gazeta.

Bortnikov and his son Denis are members of the Navalny 35, a list of Russian human rights abusers compiled by Alexei Navalny, both have been subsequently sanctioned by the United States, European Union, United Kingdom, Canada, and New Zealand.

In March 2021, a law was enacted to allow presidential appointees like Bortnikov (who turns 70 in 2022) to serve past statutory retirement age.

On 20 March 2022, the Security Service of Ukraine (SBU) alleged that Bortnikov was a favorite to replace Vladimir Putin among a group of Russian elites plotting to assassinate Putin in a bid to stabilize the economy and reestablish ties with the West following sanctions imposed on Russia for the 2022 invasion of Ukraine. 

On 25 March 2022, The Moscow Times noted that Bortnikov had disappeared from public view since around 11 March 2022, along with other senior siloviki including Sergey Shoigu, Igor Kostyukov and Viktor Zolotov. In response state TV programs subsequently broadcast a purported 24 March security council meeting including brief appearances by many of the missing men, including Bortnikov, but it appeared to simply be an edited version of the earlier 11 March security council meeting.

Diplomatic role 

In February 2015, at the invitation of the United States, Bortnikov led a Russian delegation to a Washington, D.C. summit on countering violent extremism. His flight to the United States debuted a one-of-a-kind FSB operated Tupolev Tu-214PU airborne command post.

On 27–28 January 2018, Bortnikov again visited the United States on a highly unusual trip together with the head of the Foreign Intelligence Service (SVR) Sergey Naryshkin, and the head of military intelligence of the Russian Forces (GRU), Igor Korobov. The three met in Washington with CIA director Mike Pompeo, and according to press releases from the CIA, reportedly discussed the threat posed by Islamic State fighters returning from Syria to Russia and Central Asia following  interventions in the Syrian Civil War by a U.S.-led coalition and separately by Russia. Bortnikov called the meetings "very useful."

As chairman of the Russian National Anti-Terrorist Committee and Chairman of the Council of Heads of Security Agencies and Special Services of the Commonwealth of Independent States, Bortnikov has often been tapped as an emissary to former Soviet states during times of heightened tension. On 21 May 2019, he appeared in Dushanbe to meet with leaders of Tajikistan about the increasing presence of Islamic State fighters in neighboring northern Afghanistan. During the 2020 Nagorno-Karabakh War, he was dispatched to both Armenia and Azerbaijan, and led a trilateral meeting headlined by intelligence chiefs from both belligerents. In December 2021, he was sent to Uzbekistan to meet with Uzbek president Shavkat Mirziyoyev.

Personal life and family 

Bortnikov is married to Tatyana Bortnikova (née Borisovna). Together they have one son,  (born November 19, 1974), who is deputy director of VTB Bank, the second largest financial institution in Russia. Bortnikov's brother, Mikhail Vasilyevich Bortnikov, born in 1953, is a retired colonel, his sister Olga Vasilievna Bortnikova, born in 1958, is a pensioner.

From November 2004 to May 2008, Bortnikov was a member of the board of directors of Sovcomflot (SCF), Russia's largest shipping company and hydrocarbon transporter.

Corruption allegations 
On 27 July 2015, Novaya Gazeta released an investigative report which claimed Bortnikov, as well as a number of other senior FSB officials, were involved in a land settlement in Moscow's Odintsov district. In exchange for illegally privatizing the public land, each allegedly received around $2.5 million. According to the newspaper, the published investigations are one of the reasons the FSB has offered to shut down public access to Rosreestr's registry of property ownership. Kremlin spokesman Dmitry Peskov said he was unaware of any investigation into wrongdoing.

In 2018, Roskomnadzor shut down the investigative reporting website Russiangate.com hours after the site published a report alleging that Bortnikov owned a secret land plot and luxury house in Sestroretsk, 30 kilometers northwest of Saint Petersburg, worth up to 300 million rubles ($5.3 million), on which he had not been paying taxes.

Sanctions 
On 22 February 2022, in response to Russia recognizing the independence of separatist regions in eastern Ukraine during the prelude to the 2022 Russian invasion of Ukraine, the United States imposed sanctions on several Russian individuals and banks, including Bortnikov and his son, Denis.

Honors and awards

 Hero of the Russian Federation (awarded by "closed decree" in 2019 or 2020)
 Order of St. George (4th degree)
 Order of Alexander Nevsky
 Order of Merit for the Fatherland, full cavalier of the order (1st, 2nd, 3rd and 4th class awards)
 Order of Military Merit
 Order of Honor
 Order of Friendship
 Diploma of the Government of the Russian Federation (2006)

Notes

References

External links
His page in electronic database "anticompromat.ru" (Russian)  and his index page, by Vladimir Pribylovsky

1951 births
Living people
People from Perm, Russia
Directors of the Federal Security Service
Generals of the army (Russia)
Heroes of the Russian Federation
Russian politicians
KGB officers
Full Cavaliers of the Order "For Merit to the Fatherland"
Recipients of the Order of Military Merit (Russia)
Recipients of the Order of Honour (Russia)
Russian individuals subject to the U.S. Department of the Treasury sanctions
Russian individuals subject to European Union sanctions
Specially Designated Nationals and Blocked Persons List
Communist Party of the Soviet Union members